Jagatpur Sadhana High School is a secondary educational institution at the union of Jagatpur in Titas Upazila, Comilla District, Bangladesh. Jagatpur Shadhana High School was founded 1950 by Samsuddin Ahmed.

References 

Schools in Comilla District